Events in the year 1964 in the Republic of India.

Incumbents
 President of India – Sarvepalli Radhakrishnan
 Prime Minister of India – Jawaharlal Nehru until 27 May, Gulzarilal Nanda until 9 June (acting Prime Minister), Lal Bahadur Shastri
 Chief Justice of India – Bhuvaneshwar Prasad Sinha until 31 January, P. B. Gajendragadkar

Governors
 Andhra Pradesh – Satyawant Mallannah Shrinagesh (until May 4), Pattom A. Thanu Pillai (starting May 4)
 Assam – Vishnu Sahay
 Bihar – M. A. S. Ayyangar
 Gujarat – Mehdi Nawaz Jung
 Karnataka – S. M. Shrinagesh 
 Kerala – V. V. Giri 
 Madhya Pradesh – Hari Vinayak Pataskar
 Maharashtra – Vijaya Lakshmi Pandit (until 18 October), P V Cherian (starting 14 November)
 Nagaland – Vishnu Sahay 
 Odisha – Ajudhia Nath Khosla 
 Punjab – Pattom A. Thanu Pillai (until 4 May), Hafiz Mohammad Ibrahim (starting 4 May)
 Rajasthan –  Sampurnanand 
 Uttar Pradesh – Bishwanath Das 
 West Bengal – Padmaja Naidu

Events
 National income - 268,953 million
 January  4 - The lost relic recovered in connection with 1963 Hazratbal Shrine theft.
 April 8 - Jammu and Kashmir (state) withdrew the Kashmir Conspiracy Case from a special court.
 April 11 - Thirty two Council members walks out of Communist Party of India National Council resulting in the 1964 split in the Communist Party of India.
 May 27 – Prime Minister Jawaharlal Nehru dies after a five-month illness; he is succeeded by Lal Bahadur Shastri.
 July 1 - IDBI Bank was established through an Act of Parliament.
 August 29 - The far right Hindu outfit,  Vishva Hindu Parishad was founded.
 October 30 - Sirima–Shastri Pact signed to grant citizenship to almost 9 lakhs Tamils based in Ceylon.

Law
 The Seventeenth Amendment of the Constitution of India

Arts and literature
2 September – Indian Hungry generation poets arrested on charges of conspiracy against the State and Obscenity in literature.
National Film Archive of India established in Pune.

Sport
Charanjeet Singh (hockey player) is awarded the Padma Shri.

Births
20 January – Fareed Zakaria, journalist 
16 February – Shrirang Barne, politician, Member of Parliament from Maval constituency
30 April – Abhishek Chatterjee, Bengali film and television actor.
19 May –  Murali, actor. (died 2010).
1 June – Rashid Patel, cricketer (Indian pace bowler, Lamba incident). 
22 June – Amit Shah, politician.
13 August – Harisree Ashokan, actor.
10 September –  Ramesh Aravind, actor and director. 
14 November – Manoj Singh Mandavi, politician (died 2022).
10 December – Jayaram, actor.

Full date unknown
Bem Le Hunte, author.

Deaths
27 May – Jawaharlal Nehru, politician and 1st Prime Minister of India (b. 1889).
6 February – Rajkumari Amrit Kaur, freedom fighter, social activist and Health Minister (b. 1887).
10 October – Guru Dutt, film director, producer, and actor (b. 1925).

See also 
 Bollywood films of 1964

References

 
India
Years of the 20th century in India